Sunil Grover (born 3 August 1977) is an Indian actor and comedian from Mumbai who works in Hindi and Punjabi films and television. He came into limelight for his portrayal as Gutthi on television show Comedy Nights with Kapil but gained popularity for playing the role of Dr Mashhoor Gulati and Rinku Devi on The Kapil Sharma Show. He was also seen in Bollywood films Gabbar Is Back, The Legend of Bhagat Singh and Bharat.

Personal life
Grover was born on 3 August 1977 in Mandi Dabwali town of Sirsa district, Haryana. He received Master's Degree in Theatre from Panjab University Chandigarh. He is married to Aarti and has a son Mohan.

In February 2022, Grover suffered a heart attack, and had to undergo four bypass surgeries.

Acting career
Grover was discovered during his college days by the late satirist and comedian Jaspal Bhatti. He has also acted in India's first silent comedy show, SAB TV's Gutur Gu in the initial 26 episodes.

During 2000s, he made his television debut with Chala Lallan Hero Banne on Filmy.

He gained a lot of popularity from the comedy show Comedy Nights with Kapil and became well known for his comical characters like Gutthi, Rinku Bhabi and Dr. Mashoor Gulati. He also mimics famous Bollywood actors like Amitabh Bachhan and many others in the show which were mostly liked by the viewers. But after having a fight with his co-actor Kapil Sharma, Sunil left the show.

Soon after leaving Kapil's show, Grover returned to television with Star Plus's show Kanpur Wale Khuranas with Aparshakti Khurana as the host. The plot of the show was similar to that of The Kapil Sharma Show, but it didn't last long and soon went off air.

In 2016, Grover debuted in the Punjab film industry with Vaisakhi List and the same year he portrayed Shraddha Kapoor's father in Baaghi.

He made a comeback in television industry in August 2020 with the show Gangs of Filmistan on Star Bharat where he played role of Bhindi Bhai. The show ended in October 2020.

In 2021, Grover portrayed Gurpal Chauhan in political drama web series Tandav, directed by Ali Abbas Zafar with an ensemble cast of Saif Ali Khan, Tigmanshu Dhulia, Kumud Mishra, Mohammed Zeeshan Ayyub, Gauahar Khan, Amyra Dastur, Kritika Kamra, Sarah Jane Dias and Sandhya Mridul, Anup Soni and Dino Morea. In the same year, he portrayed Sonu Singh in the thriller web-series Sunflower, for which he shed almost 8.1 kilos.

Filmography

Films

Television

Web series

Radio

Songs

Dubbing roles

Animated films

Awards

References

External links
 
 

1977 births
Living people
Punjabi Hindus
Indian male comedians
Indian male film actors
Indian male television actors
People from Sirsa, Haryana
Male actors from Haryana
Amitabh Bachchan imitators